Alf's Carpet is a 1929 British comedy film directed by W. P. Kellino and starring Gerald Rawlinson, Gladys Hamer, Harald Madsen and Carl Schenstrøm. It was loosely based on the 1920 novel Alf's Button by W.A. Darlington. It is also known by the alternative title The Rocket Bus.

Production
The film was made by British International Pictures at Elstree Studios. It was originally intended as a silent, but as British studios switched to sound film and large chunks of it were shot in sound.

Cast
 Gerald Rawlinson as Jimmy Donaldson
 Gladys Hamer as Lizzie Fletcher
 Harald Madsen as Alf
 Carl Schenstrøm as Bill
 Philip Hewland as Djinn
 Edward O'Neill as Joan's Father
 Janice Adair as Joan
 Frank Perfitt as Caliph

References

Bibliography
 Low, Rachael. History of the British Film, 1918–1929. George Allen & Unwin, 1971.
 Warren, Patricia. Elstree: The British Hollywood. Columbus Books, 1988.
 Wood, Linda. British Films 1927–1939. British Film Institute, 1986.

1929 films
1929 comedy films
British buddy comedy films
1920s English-language films
British silent feature films
Films directed by W. P. Kellino
Films shot at British International Pictures Studios
Transitional sound comedy films
Films based on British novels
British black-and-white films
1920s British films
Silent comedy films